South Carolina Highway 12 (SC 12) is a  state highway in the U.S. state of South Carolina. It serves Columbia and areas to its east. It serves as a parallel route to Interstate 20 (I-20) for much of its length.

Route description
The route begins as a four-lane highway, splitting from U.S. Highway 1 (US 1) where it is known as Jarvis Klapman Boulevard. Through West Columbia, the highway has a mix of at-grade intersections (including one at SC 35) and interchanges (with 9th Street and US 378). It crosses the Congaree River on the Jefferson Davis McMahan Bridge headed into downtown Columbia. For a  stretch in Columbia, the highway splits into a one way pair separated by a city block: Hampton Street and Park Street for eastbound traffic, and Taylor Street and Williams Street for westbound traffic. Continuing east, the route keeps the name Taylor Street. After its intersection with US 1, the road changes its name to Forest Drive as it passes through Forest Acres.

After a sharp turn at the unsigned Spur SC 12, the road is known as Percival Road, then Fort Jackson Road. North and east of downtown Columbia, the route runs next to Fort Jackson and parallel to I-77 then I-20. The route traverses through rural land before reaching its terminus at US 601 at I-20's exit 92.

History

Previous designations
There have been two previous versions of SC 12. The first version ran from the 5th Street Bridge at the Georgia-South Carolina state line near Augusta, Georgia, to Aiken, Leesville, and Lexington, South Carolina before ending in West Columbia. Today, this route is marked as US 1 from the state line to West Columbia, which was assigned the route in 1927. SC 12 was dropped from the route in 1928, the year afterwards.

The second former route of SC 12 was established between 1928 and 1931. In 1934, North Carolina changed NC 25 to NC 75, and South Carolina renumbered SC 12 to SC 75 four years later, in 1938.

Major intersections

Special routes

West Columbia connector route

South Carolina Highway 12 Connector (SC 12 Conn.) follows 9th Street in West Columbia from U.S. Route 1 (US 1; Meeting Street) to US 378 (Sunset Boulevard).

Columbia spur route

South Carolina Highway 12 Spur (SC 12 Spur) is a  extension of Forest Drive from SC 12 to an interchange with Interstate 77 (I-77) at its exit 12. Past I-77, the road name becomes Strom Thurmond Boulevard and ends at Fort Jackson's Gate 2.

See also

References

External links

SC 12 at Virginia Highways' South Carolina Highways Annex

012
Transportation in Lexington County, South Carolina
Transportation in Richland County, South Carolina
Transportation in Kershaw County, South Carolina